Hoda Haddad (in Arabic: هدى حداد), is a Lebanese singer and actress. She is known for her songs and for her work with the Rahbani Brothers, Nasri Shamseddine, Joseph Nassif, Elie Choueiri and her older sister Fairuz Haddad.

Biography 

Hoda Haddad was born shortly after the Lebanese independence (born August 15, 1944) to a modest family in the capital city of Lebanon, Beirut. Her parents were Wadih Haddad, a print worker, and Lisa Boustany, a housewife. She had two sisters Nouhad (known by her artistic name Fairuz), Amal, and a brother Joseph. Hoda comes from the Chouf district as her husband Chawki Ziade. She has two children: Dina and Joseph.

Her artistic life

Early life 
Hoda Haddad joined her sister, the great artist Fairuz, in most of her artistic work, even though she only occasionally performs short roles. This did not prevent her from achieving a lot of glory and fame, which accompanies both Rahbani's songs and participation in her huge successful works of films and plays. The series is called "Yawm Yawm Liyum" (Day of the Year), the first part of 1972, and the second part of 1979. She sang with her sister Fairuz in the play "Mays Al-Reem", "Lulu", "Sahrat Hob" and "Petra" (Petra) in 1977. There was also the play "Akher Ayyam Sikrat" by Mansour Rahbani in 1998, and finally "Opera al-Dayaa" in 2009. The lyrics were presented by the program in 1971. Riadh Sharara also presented the show "Sahour and Ghounieh", in which she sang for the first time the song "Khalini Hobak", with lyrics by Ziad al-Rahbani.

Her success 
Many people talked about her beautiful, soft and expressive voice. They asked her once about the reason of her non spread. She said:" if the sun shine, its light covers the stars". Artist Hoda Haddad participated in the Rahbani Art School starting with the play "Dawalib Al-Hawa" in 1962. She represented the innocent rural girl with her poetic, lively face, which is full of vitality, femininity, and innocence. She sang a number of songs in plays and television sketches, including the song "Darj Al-Yasmeen"," Ya Tala'il"," Darj Al-Yasmeen"," Lido Alu Talaa"," Al-Yasmeen Al-Yasmeen Lo'h". She also performed another song in the play "Qasidat Hob", which was called "My Name Is My Love". Singer Hoda Haddad has also had prose conversations in all plays, from the play "The Ring Vendor" to the play "Petra" in 1977, either a second or a third character. She also performed real songs such as "Rizqallah Ala Al-Arabiyat" and "Ala Al-Chaara Talaqna." The presence of an innocent character like Hoda Haddad is necessary for the completion of the innocent singing and poetry theater, which is far from sensationalism and strife. A rising artist of the same name appeared, to complete the fight against this great artist, yet she remained in the hearts of many, despite the fact that some have taken advantage of her name and art. Hoda Haddad, like her elder sister Fairuz, is poorly known.She acted in many series and sang many songs in the 1980s and 1990s. such as: "Ya Hallel", "Ya Bayya"," Let Us Hear No One", "Lina and Lina", and "Ala Shar". She also performed concerts in Lebanon and acted in a number of Lebanese television series.

Achievements

Series (مسلسلات) 
 Schools Days (in Arabic: أيام الدراسة)
 From day to day part one (in Arabic: من يوم ليوم الجزء الأول)
 Saat w Ghaniya (in Arabic: ساعة وغنية
 Dafater Al Dafater (in Arabic: دفاتر الليل)

Plays 
 Wheels of Fancy (in Arabic: دواليب الهوى), 1962
 Love Story (in Arabic: قصة حب)
 Mays Alreem (in Arabic: ميس الريم)
 Station (in Arabic: المحطة)
 Lulu (in Arabic: لولو)
 Petra (in Arabic: بترا,) 1977
 The Last Days of Socrates (in Arabic: آخر أيام سقراط)
 Natoura Mafatih Al Dayaa (in Arabic: ناطورة المفاتيح الضيعة)

Movies 
 The Ring Vendor (in Arabic: بياع الخواتم)
 Berlik Travel (in Arabic: سفر برلك)
 The Lost Wife (in Arabic: الزوجة المفقودة)

References 

Lebanese singers
Lebanese actresses
1944 births
Living people